Cajsa von Zeipel (born November 23, 1983) is Swedish sculptor born in Gothenburg, now living and working in New York City. She is most known for her current post-human works created in pastel colored silicone.

Von Zeipel's work is the subject of the 2015 book Pro Anatomy which features essays by writers Andrew Durbin, Chris Ford, Stefanie Hessler, Sarah Nicole Prickett, and Lyndsy Welgos,  .

Her two sculptures, Post Me, Post You and Celesbian Terrain at the 2022 New York City edition of the Frieze Art Fair at The Shed created a stir. Von Zeipel's work is currently the subject of a solo exhibition at the Rubell Museum. Von Zeipel's work Seconds in Ecstasy (2010) is held in the permanent collection of the Gothenburg Museum of Art and currently on display is the art institution's sculpture hall.

References

1983 births
Swedish artists
Living people